Brogan is an unincorporated community and Census-designated place (CDP) in Malheur County, Oregon, United States, on U.S. Route 26. Brogan was founded by D. M. Brogan in 1909, and when a post office was established in the locality on April 23 that year, it was named for him. Brogan is located on the north end of the now-abandoned Union Pacific Railroad branch line from Vale.

Demographics

Brogan is part of the Ontario, OR–ID Micropolitan Statistical Area. At the 2010 census, the population was 90 (47 female and 43 male). The median age was 50.5 years. There were 41 households, five of which included children under age 18.

Education
Brogan is within the Vale School District 84. This district has grades K-12 and operates Vale High School.

References

External links

Images of Brogan from Flickr

Populated places established in 1909
Ontario, Oregon micropolitan area
Unincorporated communities in Malheur County, Oregon
Census-designated places in Oregon
1909 establishments in Oregon
Census-designated places in Malheur County, Oregon
Unincorporated communities in Oregon